Jude Thaddeus Okolo KC*HS (born 18 December 1956) is a prelate of the Catholic Church who has worked in the diplomatic service of the Holy See since 1990. He has been an archbishop since 2008 and held the post of Apostolic Nuncio in several countries. He has been the Apostolic Nuncio to the Czech Republic since 2022.

In addition to his native Igbo (and Hausa spoken where he was born), Okolo is fluent in Igbo, Hausa, English, French, Italian, Spanish and German. He can speak and understand Czech.

Biography
Jude Thaddeus Okolo was born in Kano, Nigeria, on 18 December 1956. He was ordained a priest by Archbishop Francis Arinze on 2 July 1983. He was assigned to the Roman Curia where he worked in the area of Dialogue with Christian Sects from 1984 to 1986. Afterwards, he undertook his post-graduate studies in Rome and obtained a doctorate in Canon Law, and a Diploma in Diplomatic Studies.

He joined the diplomatic service of the Holy See in 1990 and served in diplomatic missions and nunciatures in Sri Lanka, Haiti, the Antillean Islands and other Caribbean island nations, Switzerland, the Czech Republic, and Australia. 

On 2 August 2008, Pope Benedict XVI appointed him titular archbishop of Novica and Apostolic Nuncio to the Central African Republic and Chad. He received his episcopal consecration from Cardinal Francis Arinze on 27 September 2008.

On 7 October 2013, Pope Francis named him Apostolic Nuncio to the Dominican Republic and Apostolic Delegate to Puerto Rico.

On 13 May 2017, Pope Francis named him Apostolic Nuncio to Ireland.

On 1 May 2022, Pope Francis named him Apostolic Nuncio to the Czech Republic.

See also
 List of heads of the diplomatic missions of the Holy See

References

External links

 Catholic Hierarchy: Archbishop Jude Thaddeus Okolo 

1956 births
Living people
Apostolic Nuncios to the Central African Republic
Apostolic Nuncios to Chad
Apostolic Nuncios to the Dominican Republic
Apostolic Nuncios to Ireland
Apostolic Nuncios to Puerto Rico
Apostolic Nuncios to the Czech Republic
Nigerian Roman Catholic bishops
Bishops appointed by Pope Benedict XVI
People from Kano
21st-century Roman Catholic titular archbishops